The beam diameter or beam width of an electromagnetic beam is the diameter along any specified line that is perpendicular to the beam axis and intersects it. Since beams typically do not have sharp edges, the diameter can be defined in many different ways. Five definitions of the beam width are in common use: D4σ, 10/90 or 20/80 knife-edge, 1/e2, FWHM, and D86.  The beam width can be measured in units of length at a particular plane perpendicular to the beam axis, but it can also refer to the angular width, which is the angle subtended by the beam at the source. The angular width is also called the beam divergence.

Beam diameter is usually used to characterize electromagnetic beams in the optical regime, and occasionally in the microwave regime, that is, cases in which the aperture from which the beam emerges is very large with respect to the wavelength.

Beam diameter usually refers to a beam of circular cross section, but not necessarily so. A beam may, for example, have an elliptical cross section, in which case the orientation of the beam diameter must be specified, for example with respect to the major or minor axis of the elliptical cross section. The term "beam width" may be preferred in applications where the beam does not have circular symmetry.

Definitions

Rayleigh beamwidth
The angle between the maximum peak of radiated power and the first null (no power radiated in this direction) is called the Rayleigh beamwidth.

Full width at half maximum

The simplest way to define the width of a beam is to choose two diametrically opposite points at which the irradiance is a specified fraction of the beam's peak irradiance, and take the distance between them as a measure of the beam's width. An obvious choice for this fraction is ½ (−3 dB), in which case the diameter obtained is the full width of the beam at half its maximum intensity (FWHM). This is also called the half-power beam width (HPBW).

1/e2 width 
The 1/e2 width is equal to the distance between the two points on the marginal distribution that are 1/e2 = 0.135 times the maximum value. In many cases, it makes more sense to take the distance between points where the intensity falls to  1/e2 = 0.135 times the maximum value. If there are more than two points that are 1/e2 times the maximum value, then the two points closest to the maximum are chosen.

The American National Standard Z136.1-2007 for Safe Use of Lasers (p. 6) defines the beam diameter as the distance between diametrically opposed points in that cross-section of a beam where the power per unit area is 1/e (0.368) times that of the peak power per unit area.  This is the beam diameter definition that is used for computing the maximum permissible exposure to a laser beam.  In addition, the Federal Aviation Administration also uses the 1/e definition for laser safety calculations in FAA Order JO 7400.2, Para. 29-1-5d.

Measurements of the 1/e2 width only depend on three points on the marginal distribution, unlike D4σ and knife-edge widths that depend on the integral of the marginal distribution.  1/e2 width measurements are noisier than D4σ width measurements.  For multimodal marginal distributions (a beam profile with multiple peaks), the 1/e2 width usually does not yield a meaningful value and can grossly underestimate the inherent width of the beam.  For multimodal distributions, the D4σ width is a better choice. For an ideal single-mode Gaussian beam, the D4σ, D86 and 1/e2 width measurements would give the same value.

D4σ or second-moment width 
The D4σ width of a beam in the horizontal or vertical direction is 4 times σ, where σ is the standard deviation of the horizontal or vertical marginal distribution respectively.  Mathematically, the D4σ beam width in the x dimension for the beam profile  is expressed as

where

is the centroid of the beam profile in the x direction.

When a beam is measured with a laser beam profiler, the wings of the beam profile influence the D4σ value more than the center of the profile, since the wings are weighted by the square of its distance, x2, from the center of the beam.  If the beam does not fill more than a third of the beam profiler's sensor area, then there will be a significant number of pixels at the edges of the sensor that register a small baseline value (the background value).  If the baseline value is large or if it is not subtracted out of the image, then the computed D4σ value will be larger than the actual value because the baseline value near the edges of the sensor are weighted in the D4σ integral by x2.  Therefore, baseline subtraction is necessary for accurate D4σ measurements.  The baseline is easily measured by recording the average value for each pixel when the sensor is not illuminated.  The D4σ width, unlike the FWHM and 1/e2 widths, is meaningful for multimodal marginal distributions — that is, beam profiles with multiple peaks — but requires careful subtraction of the baseline for accurate results.  The D4σ is the ISO international standard definition for beam width.

Knife-edge width 
Before the advent of the CCD beam profiler, the beam width was estimated using the knife-edge technique: slice a laser beam with a razor and measure the power of the clipped beam as a function of the razor position.  The measured curve is the integral of the marginal distribution, and starts at the total beam power and decreases monotonically to zero power.  The width of the beam is defined as the distance between the points of the measured curve that are 10% and 90% (or 20% and 80%) of the maximum value.  If the baseline value is small or subtracted out, the knife-edge beam width always corresponds to 60%, in the case of 20/80, or 80%, in the case of 10/90, of the total beam power no matter what the beam profile.  On the other hand, the D4σ, 1/e2, and FWHM widths encompass fractions of power that are beam-shape dependent.  Therefore, the 10/90 or 20/80 knife-edge width is a useful metric when the user wishes to be sure that the width encompasses a fixed fraction of total beam power.  Most CCD beam profiler's software can compute the knife-edge width numerically.

Fusing knife-edge method with imaging 
The main drawback of the knife-edge technique is that the measured value is displayed only on the scanning direction, minimizing the amount of relevant beam information. To overcome this drawback, an innovative technology offered commercially allows multiple directions beam scanning to create an image like beam representation.

By mechanically moving the knife edge across the beam, the amount of energy impinging the detector area is determined by the obstruction.  The profile is then measured from the knife-edge velocity and its relation to the detector's energy reading. Unlike other systems, a unique scanning technique uses several different oriented knife-edges to sweep across the beam. By using tomographic reconstruction, mathematical processes reconstruct the laser beam size in different orientations to an image similar to the one produced by CCD cameras. The main advantage of this scanning method is that it is free from pixel size limitations (as in CCD cameras) and allows beam reconstructions with wavelengths not usable with existing CCD technology. Reconstruction is possible for beams in deep UV to far IR.

D86 width 
The D86 width is defined as the diameter of the circle that is centered at the centroid of the beam profile and contains 86% of the beam power. The solution for D86 is found by computing the area of increasingly larger circles around the centroid until the area contains 0.86 of the total power.  Unlike the previous beam width definitions, the D86 width is not derived from marginal distributions.  The percentage of 86, rather than 50, 80, or 90, is chosen because a circular Gaussian beam profile integrated down to 1/e2 of its peak value contains 86% of its total power.  The D86 width is often used in applications that are concerned with knowing exactly how much power is in a given area.  For example, applications of high-energy laser weapons and lidars require precise knowledge of how much transmitted power actually illuminates the target.

ISO11146 beam width for elliptic beams 

The definition given before holds for stigmatic (circular symmetric) beams only. For astigmatic beams, however, a more rigorous definition of the beam width has to be used:

and

This definition also incorporates information about x–y correlation , but for circular symmetric beams, both definitions are the same.

Some new symbols appeared within the formulas, which are the first- and second-order moments:

the beam power 

and 

Using this general definition, also the beam azimuthal angle  can be expressed.

Measurement
International standard ISO 11146-1:2005 specifies methods for measuring beam widths (diameters), divergence angles and beam propagation ratios of laser beams (if the beam is stigmatic) and for general astigmatic beams ISO 11146-2 is applicable. The D4σ beam width is the ISO standard definition and the measurement of the M² beam quality parameter requires the measurement of the D4σ widths.

The other definitions provide complementary information to the D4σ. The D4σ and knife-edge widths are sensitive to the baseline value, whereas the 1/e2 and FWHM widths are not.  The fraction of total beam power encompassed by the beam width depends on which definition is used.

The width of laser beams can be measured by capturing an image on a camera, or by using a laser beam profiler.

See also
Beam waist
Fresnel zone

References

Antennas (radio)
Optics